Doulton Langlands (born 29 July 1999) is an Australian rules footballer who played for the St Kilda Football Club in the Australian Football League (AFL). He was selected at pick #8 in the 2018 Rookie draft.

AFL career
Langlands' 2019 pre season was interrupted by a concussion and hamstring tendon injury. He made his senior debut against Western Bulldogs in round 13 of the 2019 season. Langlands ultimately played three games in 2019 before he was sidelined again by a groin injury. He managed two goals from these games. Following the 2019 season, Langlands signed a one year contract extension to remain on St Kilda's rookie list in 2020.

At the beginning of the 2020 pre season, Langlands came 2nd in St Kilda's 3km time trial, beating his previous personal best by 40 seconds.

At the conclusion of the 2020 premiership season, Langlands was delisted by the St Kilda Football Club.

References

External links

Doulton Langlands from AFL Tables
  

St Kilda Football Club players
Sandringham Football Club players
Murray Bushrangers players
1999 births
Living people
Australian rules footballers from Victoria (Australia)
Perth Football Club players